Band of Merrymakers is a holiday music supergroup created by hit songwriters Sam Hollander and Kevin Griffin in 2014. The group was established with the philanthropic goal of raising awareness and donations for non-profit organizations and charities. The group's debut album, Welcome to Our Christmas Party, was released October 23, 2015, through Sony Masterworks.

Conception
Songwriters Sam Hollander and Kevin Griffin were deep in a summer songwriting session in 2014 when they wandered into the topic of holiday music. They both suddenly wondered: where had all the holiday musical philanthropy gone? Where were all the original songs? They immediately set out to replicate the family holiday splendor of records like Band Aid's "Do They Know It's Christmas" & Lifebeat's A Very Special Christmas series.

Release and Promotion

Release
The group's debut album, Welcome to Our Christmas Party, was released October 23, 2015, through Sony Masterworks. The album features guest appearances from Christina Perri, Mark McGrath (Sugar Ray), Alex & Sierra, Natasha Bedingfield, Michael Fitzpatrick (Fitz and the Tantrums), Tyler Glenn of Neon Trees, Charity Daw, Charles Kelley of Lady Antebellum, Owl City, Bebe Rexha, Nick Hexum of 311, Andrew McMahon, Jason Wade (Lifehouse), David Ryan Harris, David Hodges (Evanescence), The Mowglis, Street Corner Symphony, 3OH!3, Dan Wilson (Semisonic), Lisa Loeb, and Firekid, along with writer/producers Sam Hollander and Kevin Griffin (Better Than Ezra).

Promotion
The band has performed on Jimmy Kimmel Live (ABC), Christmas in Rockefeller Center (NBC), The TODAY Show (NBC),
Hollywood Christmas Parade (CW), The Home and Family Show (Hallmark), Pop Up Santa (ABC Family) and Extra (NBC).

Charts
Welcome to Our Christmas Party reached #9 on the iTunes Holiday Charts.

Reviews
- “Catchy? Undoubtedly.  Anthemic? Yep.  But even more important, despite coming from a handful of adults…it captures the childish delight of getting in the holiday spirit.” – Entertainment Weekly

- “The irresistibly catchy song is bound to be stuck in your head all day, but in the good way – the chorus is fun and upbeat and will definitely get you into the holiday spirit.” – PopSugar

- "Thankfully, we’re super into Holiday music and we’ve actually already started to find some new tunes to transition into Winter!  One of our faves so far has to be Band of Merrymakers' debut album, Welcome to our Christmas Party — especially their lead single Snow Snow Snow!"  - Perez Hilton

Charity
A portion of the proceeds went to the MusiCares Foundation.

References

Musical groups established in 2014
2014 establishments in the United States